Owen Rhys Evans (born 28 November 1996) is a Welsh professional footballer who  plays for Walsall as a goalkeeper.

Club career
Evans made his professional debut in a 2–1 victory against Blackpool in the second round of the 2017–18 EFL Cup. On 25 July 2019, Evans went out on loan again, this time joining League Two side Macclesfield Town on a season-long loan deal.

After his spell at Macclesfield was cut short, Evans signed for Cheltenham Town on 9 January 2020 for the rest of the 2019–20 season. In June 2022 Evans signed for Walsall on a two year contract.

International career
Evans was named in Wales Under-21 squad for the 2019 UEFA European Under-21 Championship Group 8 matches against Switzerland on 1 September 2017 and Portugal on 5 September 2017.

Career statistics

References

External links
 

1996 births
Living people
Welsh footballers
Association football goalkeepers
Wigan Athletic F.C. players
Rhyl F.C. players
North Ferriby United A.F.C. players
Macclesfield Town F.C. players
Cheltenham Town F.C. players
Walsall F.C. players
Witton Albion F.C. players
Sutton United F.C. players
Cymru Premier players
National League (English football) players